Griseldo Cobo (born 27 January 1938) is a Bolivian footballer. He played in three matches for the Bolivia national football team from 1967 to 1973. He was also part of Bolivia's squad for the 1967 South American Championship.

References

External links
 

1938 births
Living people
Bolivian footballers
Bolivia international footballers
Place of birth missing (living people)
Association football goalkeepers